In geology, a trough is a linear structural depression that extends laterally over a distance. Although it is less steep than a trench, a trough can be a narrow basin or a geologic rift. These features often form at the rim of tectonic plates. 

There are various oceanic troughs on the ocean floors.

Examples of oceanic troughs
 Benue Trough
 Cayman Trough 
 Kings Trough
 Hesperides Trough
 Nankai Trough
 Northumberland Trough
 Okinawa Trough in the East China Sea
 Rockall Trough and others along the rift of the mid-oceanic ridge
 Salton Trough 
 South Shetland Trough
 Suakin Trough in the Red Sea
 Timor Trough

See also
 Walker Lane
 Oceanic basin

References

Depressions (geology)
Structural geology